The Islas Marías ("Mary Islands") make up an archipelago in Mexico, consisting of four islands. They are part of the municipality (municipio) of San Blas, Nayarit. The islands were used as a penal colony until February 18, 2019 when President Andrés Manuel López Obrador ordered the closure of its operation as Islas Marías Federal Prison.

The first European to encounter the islands was Diego Hurtado de Mendoza, a cousin of Hernán Cortés in 1532, who gave them the name Islas Magdalenas.  He found no evidence of prior habitation by the Native Americans.

In 2010 the archipelago was designated the Islas Marías Biosphere Reserve by UNESCO.

Geography
The other islands are uninhabited. The main settlement is Puerto Balleto, with a population of 602.

It houses the Islas Marías Federal Prison, which was established there in 1905. The next two largest islands are Isla María Magdalena and, further south, Isla María Cleofas. They were named after three women called Mary in the Biblical New Testament: respectively, Mary, the mother of Jesus, Mary Magdalene, and Mary, the wife of Cleopas, and are referred to as the Tres Marias. A smaller island, San Juanito, with an area of  lies off the north coast of Isla María Madre.

The islands are listed from north to south in the following table:

Geology
Research supports the hypothesis that the Islas Marias are fragments of continental crust left over from the separation of the Baja California Peninsula from the mainland of Mexico.  Rocks found on the islands correspond with rocks found around Cabo San Lucas, as well as Puerto Vallarta.

Fauna
Animal species endemic to the Islas Marías include the Tres Marías amazon, Tres Marias hummingbird and Tres Marias island mouse, in addition to the Tres Marias raccoon, a subspecies of the common raccoon.

Populated places 
All populated places of the Islas Marías are on Isla María Madre. They are listed from north to south in the following table:

Each populated center features a different economic activity. The primary population center is Puerto Balleto, the location of the administrative offices  and the primary centers of commerce and recreation. It is subdivided into four jefaturas:
Balleto, 
Bellavista, 
Unit Habitacional Miguel Hidalgo (UHMH), 
Primero de Mayo, 

In addition to prisoners, on Maria Madre island there are employees of diverse institutions of the federal government, such as the Secretariat of Public Education, the Secretariat of the Environment, the Secretariat of Communications and Transport, post office, and the Secretariat of the Navy. Another group of settlers is made up of religious ministers and acolytes of the Catholic Church, nuns of the Order of Social Service, and invited teachers, technicians and their relatives.

The colony is governed by a state official who is both the governor of the islands and chief judge. The military command is independent and is exercised by an officer of the Mexican Navy.

Weather 
The mean temperature of island remain between 84 and 89 degrees Fahrenheit throughout the year. In April, May, and June sometimes temperatures cross the limit of thirty-five degrees Celsius. In December, January, and February the temperatures remain under twenty-five degrees. Sometimes the temperature may drop under twenty degrees Celsius. Most of the time weather remains dry but July, August, and September may receive rain up to 10mm. The average wind speed is between twelve and nineteen km/hour. The below chart shows the maximum and minimum temperature.

Hurricane Willa
Hurricane Willa passed through the Islas Marias on October 23, 2018.  The National Hurricane Center reported at 9 AM MDT "Aircraft finds the core of Willa passing over Las Islas Marias Mexico".  A subsequent report from the NHC stated that "Life-threatening storm surge is occurring along the coasts of the Isla Marias'.  The NHC also reported that "An automated observing site on Las Islas Marias recently reported a sustained wind of 88 mph (142 km/h) with a gust to 112mph (180 km/h)".

Lighthouse 
There is a lighthouse located on a ridge above Puerto Balleto on Isla María Madre. The height of tower is two hundred feet or sixty-two meters. The lighthouse main gallery is painted white while the tower of the lighthouse is colored in red and white. The lighthouse is made of concrete and a large single story keeper house is also constructed with the lighthouse. The light house shines two white flashes every 10 seconds. The diameter of the light house is seven meters.

Prison of Isla Maria 
The Islas Marías Federal Prison was constructed in 1905.  One of its more notable prisoners was the Mexican progressive writer Jose Revueltas who wrote his first book Los Muros de Agua (The Walls of Water, publ.1941) while incarcerated there.

President of Mexico Andrés Manuel López Obrador announced on February 18, 2019, that his administration would close the Islas Marías Federal Prison, replacing it with a new cultural center that will be named for José Revueltas.

See also

 Tres Marias raccoon
 Tres Marias island mouse
 Tres Marías amazon parrot

Notes

References

 Link to tables of population data from Census of 2005, Nayarit INEGI: Instituto Nacional de Estadística, Geografía e Informática
Mexican islands with areas and coordinates
map

External links

Article from Mexico Desconocido 

 
Islands of Nayarit
Pacific Coast of Mexico
World Heritage Sites in Mexico
Populated places in Mexico